The Iguape Formation is a geological formation of the Santos Basin offshore of the Brazilian states of Rio de Janeiro, São Paulo, Paraná and Santa Catarina.

Etymology 
The formation is named after Iguape, São Paulo.

Description 
They are interbedded with grey-greenish clays, siltstones, marls and variegated grey fine-to-medium grained conglomerates. These facies are interbedded with and change laterally to the Marambaia Formation. The depositional environment is thought to be a marine carbonate platform, influenced by the arrival of alluvial clastics in the most proximal areas. Biostratigraphic data from planktonic foraminifera, calcareous nanofossils and palynomorphs indicate a Tertiary age.

See also 

 Campos Basin

References

Bibliography 
 
 
 

Geologic formations of Brazil
Santos Basin
Neogene Brazil
Paleogene Brazil
Neogene System of South America
Paleogene System of South America
Limestone formations
Sandstone formations
Siltstone formations
Shale formations
Marl formations
Conglomerate formations
Alluvial deposits
Shallow marine deposits
Formations
Formations
Formations
Formations
Tupi–Guarani languages